Storrs may refer to:

 Storrs (surname)
 Storrs, Connecticut, a village where the main campus of the University of Connecticut is located
 Storrs, South Yorkshire, a rural hamlet within the City of Sheffield, England
Storrs, Cumbria

See also
 Storrs Hall, a listed building in Cumbria, England
 Yealand Storrs, a hamlet in the English county of Lancashire
 Storr